Francis Betts (11 January 1844 – 15 September 1893) was a New Zealand cricketer. He played in one first-class match for Wellington in 1873/74.

See also
 List of Wellington representative cricketers

References

External links
 

1844 births
1893 deaths
New Zealand cricketers
Wellington cricketers
Cricketers from Sydney